Jesper de Jong and Bart Stevens were the defending champions but only de Jong chose to defend his title, partnering Max Houkes. De Jong and Houkes retired from their first round match against Boris Arias and Federico Zeballos.

Guido Andreozzi and Guillermo Durán won the title after defeating Facundo Díaz Acosta and Luis David Martínez 6–0, 6–4 in the final.

Seeds

Draw

References

External links
 Main draw

Challenger Ciudad de Guayaquil - Doubles
2022 Doubles